Thomas Daniel Weiskopf (November 9, 1942 – August 20, 2022) was an American professional golfer who played on the PGA Tour and the Champions Tour. His most successful decade was the 1970s. He won 16 PGA Tour titles between 1968 and 1982, including the 1973 Open Championship. After winding down his career playing golf, Weiskopf became a noted golf course architect.  He was elected to the World Golf Hall of Fame in 2023 and will be inducted in 2024.

Career
Weiskopf was born in Massillon, Ohio. He attended Benedictine High School in Cleveland, and Ohio State University where he played on the golf team. He turned professional in 1964.

Weiskopf's first win on the PGA Tour came at the Andy Williams-San Diego Open Invitational in 1968, and fifteen more followed by 1982. His career season was 1973, when he won seven tournaments around the world, including The Open Championship at Royal Troon, and he would finish that year ranked second in the world according to Mark McCormack's world golf rankings. This was to remain his only major championship victory, but he was a four-time runner-up at The Masters and also had a T2 finish at the 1976 U.S. Open.

Weiskopf won the Canadian Open in 1973 and 1975; the latter win was achieved in dramatic fashion, with a one-hole playoff win over archrival Jack Nicklaus, when Weiskopf nearly holed his approach on the 15th hole at the Royal Montreal Golf Club's Blue Course. Weiskopf was a member of the United States team in the 1973 and 1975 Ryder Cups. He qualified as well for the 1977 team, but decided to skip the competition in order to go big-game hunting.

Weiskopf's swing was much admired in the golf world. He hit the ball high, generated enormous power, and had very good control as well which is a rare combination. Weiskopf's displays of his temper on the golf course earned him the nickname of "The Towering Inferno".

Weiskopf joined the Senior PGA Tour in 1993 and won several senior tournaments, including one senior major, the 1995 U.S. Senior Open.

He also worked as a golf analyst for CBS Sports covering the 1981 and 1985 to 1995 Masters. After 2008, he contributed to ABC Sports and ESPN's coverage of The Open Championship.

Death
In 2020, Weiskopf was diagnosed with pancreatic cancer. He died at his home in Big Sky, Montana, on August 20, 2022, aged 79. His death was first announced by fellow golfer Tom Watson, who extended his condolences to the Weiskopf family in a tweet.

Golf course design
Weiskopf got into golf course design working initially with Jay Morrish, but later established his own practice. He has at least 40 courses to his credit in many parts of the world, including the Monument and Pinnacle courses at Troon North Golf Club in Scottsdale, Arizona; and Loch Lomond, the venue of the Scottish Open from 1995 to 2010. A drivable par-4 hole is a common element in most of Weiskopf's designs. Many of the courses have received considerable praise by being ranked highly in lists of top courses around the world.

In January 2016, it was announced that Weiskopf would lead a renovation of the Torrey Pines North Course in San Diego, California.

The following is a (partial) list of courses that Weiskopf either designed by himself or co-designed:
 Troon North Golf Club (Monument and Pinnacle courses), Scottsdale, Arizona
 Loch Lomond Golf Club, Luss, Argyll & Bute, Scotland
 Catamount Ranch & Club, Steamboat Springs, Colorado
 Double Eagle, Galena, Ohio
 Mira Vista Country Club, Fort Worth, Texas
 Forest Highlands (Canyon and Meadow courses), Flagstaff, Arizona
 Lahontan Golf Club, Truckee, California
 The Olympic Club (Ocean and Cliffs courses), San Francisco, California
 The Ridge at Castle Pines North, Castle Rock, Colorado
 Shanty Creek Resort — Cedar River, Bellaire, Michigan
 Quail Hollow Country Club, Concord Township, Ohio
 Snake River Sporting Club, Jackson, Wyoming
Castiglion del Bosco, Tuscany, Italy
 The Rim Golf Club, Payson, Arizona
 Silverleaf Club, Scottsdale, Arizona
 Estancia El Terrón Mendiolaza, Córdoba, Argentina
 Frost Creek, Eagle, Colorado
 Bloody Point, Daufuskie Island, South Carolina
 Black Desert Resort, Ivins, Utah
 Marbella Country Club, San Juan Capistrano, California, 1989

Amateur wins
1963 Western Amateur

Professional wins (28)

PGA Tour wins (16)

PGA Tour playoff record (2–3)

European Tour wins (2)

Sunshine Tour wins (1)

South American Golf Circuit wins (1)

Other wins (5)

Senior PGA Tour wins (4)

Senior PGA Tour playoff record (1–0)

Major championships

Wins (1)

Results timeline

CUT = missed the halfway cut (3rd round cut in 1982 Open Championship)
WD = withdrew
"T" indicates a tie for a place.

Summary

Most consecutive cuts made — 18 (1975 Masters — 1979 U.S. Open)
Longest streak of top-10s — 4 (1973 U.S. Open — 1974 Masters)

Champions Tour major championships

Wins (1)

U.S. national team appearances
Professional
 Ryder Cup: 1973 (winners), 1975 (winners)
 World Cup: 1972

References

External links
 
 Profile on sporting-heroes.net
 Profile on golfweb.com
 A 285-acre Tom Weiskopf-designed golf course

American male golfers
Ohio State Buckeyes men's golfers
PGA Tour golfers
PGA Tour Champions golfers
Ryder Cup competitors for the United States
Winners of men's major golf championships
Winners of senior major golf championships
Golf writers and broadcasters
Golf course architects
Golfers from Ohio
Sportspeople from Massillon, Ohio
Deaths from pancreatic cancer
Deaths from cancer in Montana
1942 births
2022 deaths